The Sporting Club Moknine, often referred to as SC Moknine is a Tunisian football club based in the city of Moknine. The club was founded in 1945, the team plays in red and white colors.

Stadium
Their ground is currently the Stade Mongi-Slim, which has a capacity of 5,000.

League participations
Tunisian Ligue Professionnelle 2: 2010–2013
Tunisian Ligue Professionnelle 3: ?-2010

Honours
(Ligue III):2010

References

External links
Soccerway

Association football clubs established in 1945
Football clubs in Tunisia
1945 establishments in Tunisia
Sports clubs in Tunisia